Alessandria is a city and comune in Piedmont, Italy, and the capital of the Province of Alessandria.

Alessandria is also a major railway hub.

History
Alessandria was founded in 1168 with a charter as a free comune; it was sited upon a preexisting urban nucleus, to serve as a stronghold for the Lombard League, defending the traditional liberties of the communes of northern Italy against the Imperial forces of Frederick Barbarossa. Alessandria stood in the territories of the marchese of Montferrat, a staunch ally of the Emperor, with a name assumed in 1168 to honour the Emperor's opponent, Pope Alexander III. In 1174–1175 the fortress was sorely tested by the Imperial siege and stood fast. A legend (related in Umberto Eco's book Baudolino, and which recalls one concerning Bishop Herculanus’ successful defence of Perugia several centuries earlier) says it was saved by a quick-witted peasant, Gagliaudo: he fed his cow with the last grain remaining within the city, then took it outside the city walls until he reached the Imperial camp. Here he was captured, and his cow cut open to be cooked: when the Imperials found the cow's stomach filled with grain, Gagliaudo was asked the reason to waste such a rich meal. He answered that he was forced to feed his cow with grain because there was such a lot of it, and no room to place it within the city. The Emperor, fearing that the siege would last too long, left Alessandria free (malaria was probably the real cause of his departure). A statue of Gagliaudo can be found on the left corner of the city cathedral.

Alessandria entered into jealous conflicts with the older communes of the region, in particular with Asti.

In 1348 Alessandria fell into the hands of the Visconti. In 1391 the army of Gian Galeazzo Visconti, commanded by Jacopo dal Verme, heavily defeated the French army led by Jean III of Armagnac in Alessandria.  In 1450 Alessandria passed with their possessions to the Sforza, following the career of Milan, until 1707, when it was ceded to the House of Savoy and henceforth formed part of Piedmont. The new domination was evidenced by the construction of a new big Cittadella on the left side of the river Tanaro, across from the city.

With Napoleon's success at the Battle of Marengo (1800), Alessandria fell to France and became the capital of the Napoleonic Département of Marengo. During this period another substantial fort was built to the north of the city containing impressive and substantial barracks which are still used as military headquarters and stores (2006). The remains of a second fort to the south of the city (Cristo quarter) have been sliced in two by a railway (Forte ferrovia); a third one still remains in the middle of the same quarter (Forte Acqui).

From 1814 Alessandria was Savoyard territory once more, part of the Kingdom of Sardinia. During the years of the Risorgimento, Alessandria was an active centre of the liberals.

In a suburb, Spinetta Marengo, the Battle of Marengo is reenacted annually, on June 14.

Alessandria was the first capital of an Italian province to be governed by a Socialist: the clockmaker Paolo Sacco was elected mayor on July 25, 1899.

 Owing to its marshalling yard and the bridges on the Tanaro and Bormida, Alessandria was a strategic military target during World War II and was subjected to intense Allied bombing (especially during Operation Strangle), the most serious being the raids of April 30, 1944, with 238 dead and hundreds wounded, and April 5, 1945, with 160 deaths, among them 60 children from the children's asylum in Via Gagliaudo. Altogether, 559 people were killed by air raids on Alessandria, which destroyed or badly damaged a thousand buildings. On 29 April 1945 the city was liberated from the German occupation (1943–1945) by the partisan resistance and troops of Brazilian Expeditionary Force.

On November 6, 1994, the Tanaro flooded a good part of the city, causing major damage, especially in the Orti quarter.

Jewish history
The first known Jews in Alessandria, named Abraham (son of Joseph Vitale de Sacerdoti Cohen) opened a loan bank in or about 1490. In 1590, the Jews were expelled from the Duchy of Milan, and one of Abraham's descendants travelled to Madrid, which ruled the Duchy and was permitted to stay in the town due to a large sum owed him by the government. Of the 230 Jews living in the city in 1684, 170 were members of the Vitale family. The Jewish Ghetto was established in 1724. Between 1796 and 1814, among the rest of Italian Jewry, the city Jewish congregation was emancipated, under French influence. According to Benito Mussolini's census in 1938, the town had 101 Jews. On December 13, 1943, The synagogue on Via Milano was attacked by supporters of the Italian Social Republic. Books and manuscripts were taken out of the synagogue and were set on fire at Piazza Rattazzi. In total, 48 Jews were sent from the province of Alessandria to death, most of them in Auschwitz.

Geography

Climate
Alessandria is located in a humid subtropical climate (Köppen climate classification Cfa), the city has moderately cold winters and hot, sultry summers. Rainfall is moderate, with two minimums (summer and winter) and two maximums in autumn and spring.

Government

Main sights

Monuments
 Cittadella Militare (18th century)
 The church of Santa Maria di Castello (14th and 15th century)
 The church of Santa Maria del Carmine (15th century)
 Palazzo Ghilini (1732)
 Università del Piemonte Orientale
 The Italian Branch of the Sabbath Rest Advent Church, Chiesa avventista del riposo sabatico.

Museums
 The Marengo Battle Museum
 Antiquarium Forum Fulvii
 Sale d'arte
 I percorsi del Museo Civico
 Museo del Fiume
 Museo di Scienze Naturali e Planetario
 Museo Etnografico "C'era una volta"
 Museo del Cappello Borsalino
 Sistema dei musei civici

Cemetery
 Cimitero Urbano di Alessandria

Events
 The annual Fraskettando SkaBluesJazz Festival, which takes place on the first weekend of July, has showcased the Blues Brothers, Eddie Floyd, Al Di Meola, Taj Mahal, Soft Machine, Mario Biondi, Mick Abrahams & Clive Bunker and many others.
 Michele Pittaluga International Classical Guitar Competition Premio Città di Alessandria
 International Rally "Madonnina dei Centauri".
 The International Kendo Trophy "City of Alessandria"

Transport
Alessandria railway station, opened in 1850, forms part of the Turin–Genoa railway.  It is also a junction for six other lines, to Piacenza, Novara, Pavia, Cavallermaggiore, Ovada and San Giuseppe di Cairo, respectively.

Sport
The town's professional football team is US Alessandria. Their stadium also hosts Juventus Next Generation, the reserve team for Serie A club Juventus Turin.

People born in Alessandria

 Sibilla Aleramo (1876–1960), writer
 Walter Audisio (1909–1973), partisan
 Saint Baudolino (c. 700 – c. 740), hermit of Forum Fulvii
 Umberto Eco (1932-2016), writer
 Francesco Faà di Bruno (1825–1888), mathematician and priest
 Giovanni Ferrari (1907–1982), footballer
 Marta Gastini (born 1989), actress
 Blessed Teresa Grillo Michel (1855–1944), founder of the Congregation of the Little Sisters of Divine Providence.
 Georgius Merula (c. 1430 – 1494), humanist
 Giovanni Migliara (1785–1837), painter
 Angelo Morbelli (1854–1919), painter
 Cristina Parodi (born 1964), journalist
 Urbano Rattazzi (1808–1873), statesman of the Risorgimento
 Gianni Rivera (born 1943), footballer
 Franz Sala (1886–1952), film actor and makeup artist
 Franco Sassi (1912–1993), painter
 Pier Paolo Scarrone (born 1951), footballer
 Giuseppe Vermiglio (16th–17th centuries), painter

Twin towns — sister cities

Alessandria is twinned with:

 Argenteuil, France, since 1960
 Jericho, Palestine, since 2004 
 Hradec Králové, Czech Republic, since 1961
 Karlovac, Croatia, since 1963
 Rosario, Argentina, since 1988
 Alba Iulia, Romania, since 1990

See also
Lacabòn, a local cake 
Villa del Foro, a western suburb of the town which was the site of a Roman settlement.

References

External links 

 
 The official website of the city council 

 
Cities and towns in Piedmont
Jewish Italian history